CER ( – Digital Electronic Computer) model 200 is an early digital computer developed by Mihajlo Pupin Institute (Serbia) in 1966.

See also
 CER Computers
 Mihajlo Pupin Institute
 History of computer hardware in the SFRY

One-of-a-kind computers
CER computers